Ciro Danucci (born 28 June 1983) is an Italian football manager. He is the manager of Brindisi.

Biography
Born Manduria, in the Province of Taranto, Apulia, Danucci started his senior career at Italian Serie D (Italian fifth level until 2014) club Manduria in 2001. In 2003 Danucci was signed by Martina of Serie C1.

Catania
In 2004, he was signed by Serie B club Catania. He made his second division debut on 28 November 2004, his only Catania appearance. In January 2005 Danucci returned to the third division for Reggiana. He remained in that level in 2005–06 Serie C1 for Sangiovannese, as well as Taranto in the first half of 2006–07 Serie C1.

In January 2007 Serie B struggler Cesena signed Danucci, Anastasi and Del Core from Catania in co-ownership deals, for €30,000, €280,000 and €120,000 respectively. At the end of season Cesena finished as the 15th. In June 2007 Cesena bought Anastasi outright for €1,000, while Catania bought back Danucci and Del Core for €1,000 each.

Ternana
In July 2007 Danucci was sold to Serie C1 club Ternana in another co-ownership deal for €75,000. In June 2008 Catania gave up the remain 50% registration rights for free. After 6 starts and 2 substitutes appearances in 2008–09 Lega Pro Prima Divisione (ex–Serie C1), Danucci left for Lega Pro Seconda Divisione (ex–Serie C2) club Varese on 2 February 2009. The club won the champion of Group A, as well as promotion and the runner-up in 2009 Supercoppa di Lega di Seconda Divisione.

Danucci returned to Terni in 2009–10 Lega Pro Prima Divisione. He made 26 starts for the club that season.

Juve Stabia
In 2010 Danucci left for S.S. Juve Stabia. The club won the promotion playoffs of 2010–11 Lega Pro Prima Divisione. Danucci had played all 4 matches in the playoffs.

Danucci made another 9 starts in the second division in 2011–12 Serie B for Castellammare di Stabia.

Cuneo & Sorrento
In October 2012 Danucci was signed by the third division club Cuneo. The club relegated to Lega Pro 2nd Division in 2013. On 3 August 2013 Danucci was signed by fellow fourth division club Sorrento. That season would be the last season of Lega Pro 2nd Division, as the 2 divisions of Lega Pro (ex–Serie C) would be merged, as well as reduction from 69 teams to 60 teams. On 5 August the LP 2nd Division also admitted 6 additional teams from Serie D to fill the vacancies. Sorrento finished as the 9th of Group B, 1 point below Vigor Lamezia. The hope of avoid relegation was humiliated by 0–4 lost to Arzanese in the first match of relegation tie-breaker, or "play-out". Eventually Sorrento lost 3–4 in aggregate despite a 3–0 home win. Danucci had played both matches as starting XI.

Coaching career
On 17 November 2021, he was hired as head coach of Fasano in Serie D.
On 10 June 2022, he was wired as head coach of Brindisi.

References

External links
 AIC profile (data by football.it) 
 Lega Serie B profile 
 

1983 births
Sportspeople from the Province of Taranto
Footballers from Apulia
Living people
Association football midfielders
Italian footballers
Taranto F.C. 1927 players
A.S.D. Martina Calcio 1947 players
Catania S.S.D. players
A.C. Reggiana 1919 players
A.S.D. Sangiovannese 1927 players
A.C. Cesena players
Ternana Calcio players
S.S.D. Varese Calcio players
S.S. Juve Stabia players
A.C. Cuneo 1905 players
A.S.D. Sorrento players
A.S.D. Jolly Montemurlo players
S.S.D. Città di Campobasso players
Serie B players
Serie C players
Serie D players
Italian football managers
Serie D managers